The Roman Catholic Diocese of Amargosa is a diocese located in the city of Amargosa in the Ecclesiastical province of São Salvador da Bahia in Brazil.

History
 10 May 1941: Established as Diocese of Amargosa from the Metropolitan Archdiocese of São Salvador da Bahia

Bishops
 Bishops of Amargosa (Latin Church)
 Floréncio Cicinho Vieira (11 Apr 1942  – 11 Jan 1969)
 Alair Vilar Fernandes de Melo (17 Mar 1970  – 6 Apr 1988), appointed Archbishop of Natal, Rio Grande do Norte
 João Nílton dos Santos Souza (31 Aug 1988  – 10 Jun 2015)
 Valdemir Ferreira dos Santos (1 May 2016 – 18 Aug 2021), appointed Bishop of Penedo

Other priest of this diocese who became bishop
Walfrido Teixeira Vieira, appointed Auxiliary Bishop of São Salvador da Bahia in 1961

References
 GCatholic.org
 Catholic Hierarchy

Roman Catholic dioceses in Brazil
Christian organizations established in 1941
Amargosa, Roman Catholic Diocese of
Roman Catholic dioceses and prelatures established in the 20th century